Monster Allergy is an internationally co-produced animated television series co-created by Katja Centomo, Francesco Artibani, Alessandro Barbucci, and Barbara Canepa. It was jointly produced by Futurikon, Rainbow, M6, Rai Fiction and ZDF. Based on the Italian comic book series of the same name, it was initially broadcast on Rai 2 in Italy, and later aired on M6 in France, on KiKa in Germany, on YTV in Canada, and on Kids' WB in the United States.

Beginning on 13 March 2018, the series has been officially made available for streaming on YouTube.

Plot
Monster Allergy is based on the comic book series of the same name. The series follows a young boy Ezekiel Zick (nicknamed Zick) who suffers from various allergies and has the ability to see the invisible monsters that live among us. Along with help of his best friend, Elena Potato and his talking cat, Timothy, Zick hopes to hone his powers to one day become a Monster Tamer just like his dad, Zobedja Zick.

Episodes

Characters

Tamer

The Tamers are beings with special powers; their main characteristic is The Dom, an energy that is passed from parent to child. With the passing of the generations, powers and knowledge are passed on which lead to real dynasties of Monster Tamers.

The five Dom powers are:
Sight Dom - the ability to see monsters and ghosts invisible to ordinary people.
Voice Dom - the ability of Tamers to force monsters and phantoms to do what they say.
Gesture Dom - the power to control monsters by gesture, and to capture them in a DomBox.
Enviro Dom - the ability to create an environment to be able to survive in an unfamiliar environment, and which also functions as a force field.
Energy Dom - the ability to release an energy ray that affects monsters, dark phantoms and even ordinary things, but not witches.

Dom Items
The Dom Items are valuable items that are given by the Tutors to experienced Tamers.

Universal DomBox - A gun-like container used by Tamers, it can capture any monster and multiple ones. Upon the monster's capture, the DomBox specifies the name, species, danger level, and status of the monster. However, this DomBox can only contain a monster for two hours, then it must be transferred to its specific DomBox or else the monster will escape. While the Universal DomBox can capture Dark Phantoms it will dissolve them rather than trapping them, since they are untrappable. It also have the ability to analyze any liquid substance that it's invisible to the naked eye.
Zick's Sunglasses - This item is a gift from Elena to Zick. At first, it was used to help cover Zick's eyes when they turn red, but it helps him intensify his power for the Energy Dom.
Dom Glove - This item will improve the power levels of a Tamer by capturing every four monsters by giving the Gems of Power. The Red Gem is the basic first level, while Yellow Gem is at second level. At the third level, earning the Green Gem has the ability disintegrate Dark Phantoms, and while the fourth level is the Blue Gem. It is unknown to how to earn the White Gem, the fifth and final level although since Zick can earn a new gem by collecting 4 monsters in theory to earn the White gem Zick has to capture 20 monsters.
Regular DomBox - special boxes used to hold a captured monster. There are different types of DomBoxes for each monster.
Tele-skates - These items will be earned along with the Green Gem. They have the ability to allow the carrier to teleport anywhere to its destination of their choosing. It can also be upgraded to teleport along with someone else.
Dom Staff - This Dom weapon amplifies the Tamer's Energy Dom by firing a strong ray beam through the staff .
Hypno-Disk - This device is used to erase and alter peoples memories if they see too much, and threaten to reveal the secrets of the world of monsters.
Crystallizator - This device is mainly used for freezing monsters when no Dombox is available. It has a dial to adjust the ray's temperature.
Radio-Worm - An anti-escape wristband. This tracking device makes a loud screech when the monster tries to remove it.
Disco-Monster - A gun-like device that forces a monster to dance. This makes a monster exhausted so it can be captured easily.
Densifier - This item can alter the body of a person by adjusting it to allow the body pass through any attack, walls and objective. It can also make the user body too heavy or can be used to weaken a monsters power. It's also has to ability to make the user look like a Dark Phantom.
Scepter Dom (ZetaDom Stick) - A wand with the ability to control monsters at will. It's considered to be the strongest Dom weapon. However, if the scepter is used too much, it becomes uncontrollable and the user becomes a small monster as a side effect.

Broadcast

In Italy, Monster Allergy premiered on 6 February 2006 on Rai 2.

In France, the series premiered on M6 (a co-producer of the series) on 18 October 2006 as part of its M6 Kid strand.

In Germany, the series premiered on 23 October 2006 on KiKa, a joint operation of ZDF and ARD.

In the United States, the series premiered on 23 September 2006 on Kids' WB television block broadcast on the affiliates of then-newly formed The CW network. It was shown with scenes edited or cut for time constraints and due to censorship, and the airing order did not follow production order. The series was later made available in its unaltered English dub to watch on Netflix.

in the United Kingdom the series aired on BBC One and CBBC from 2006 and later on Cartoon Network and Cartoon Network Too from 2008.

In Canada, it was broadcast on YTV during Crunch and The Zone.

In Latin America it was aired on Jetix in 2007, only season one was broadcast.

Reception
For Common Sense Media, Emily Ashby gave Monster Allergy a mixed review. She wrote that "cartoon violence (explosions, laser blasts from eyes) is commonplace throughout the show" and that it "exists mostly as TV fluff."

References

External links

Monster Allergy in planete-jeunesse 

TV
2006 Italian television series debuts
2006 French television series debuts
2006 German television series debuts
2009 Italian television series endings
2009 French television series endings
2009 German television series endings
2000s French animated television series
French children's animated action television series
French children's animated adventure television series
French children's animated comic science fiction television series
French children's animated science fantasy television series
Italian children's animated action television series
Italian children's animated adventure television series
Italian children's animated comic science fiction television series
Italian children's animated science fantasy television series
Television shows based on comics
Animated television series about children
Television series by Rainbow S.r.l.
Italian-language television shows
English-language television shows